Robertson is a given name. Notable people with the name include:

Robertson Davies (1913-1995), Canadian novelist, playwright, critic, journalist and professor
Robertson Gladstone (1805–1875), English merchant and politician
Robertson Hare (1891-1979), English comedic actor
Robertson Howard (1847–1899), American attorney, editor, and founder of Pi Kappa Alpha Fraternity
Robertson Macaulay (1833–1915), Canadian insurance company executive
Robertson Stewart (1913–2007), New Zealand industrialist and exporter